The 2012 European Canoe Slalom Championships took place in Augsburg, Germany between May 9 and 13, 2012 under the auspices of the European Canoe Association (ECA). It was the 13th edition and Augsburg hosted this event for the second time after its inaugural edition in 1996. The races were held on the Eiskanal which also hosted the 1972 Summer Olympics when canoe slalom made its first appearance at the Olympics.

This event also served as the European qualification for the 2012 Summer Olympics in London.

The women's C1 team event had its first running at the European Championships, but did not count as a medal event due to insufficient number of participating countries. An event must have at least 5 nations taking part in order to count as a medal event.

Medal summary

Men's results

Canoe

Kayak

Women's results

Canoe

Kayak

Medal table

References

 Official website
 European Canoe Association

European Canoe Slalom Championships
European Canoe Slalom Championships
European Canoe Slalom Championships
Sport in Augsburg
Canoeing and kayaking competitions in Germany
21st century in Augsburg